Rabai is a constituency in Kenya. It is one of seven constituencies in Kilifi County.

References 

Constituencies in Kilifi County